The following television stations operate on virtual channel 9 in Canada:

 CBET-DT in Windsor, Ontario
 CBKT-DT in Regina, Saskatchewan
 CBOFT-DT in Ottawa, Ontario
 CBRT-DT in Calgary, Alberta
 CFTF-DT-5 in Baie-Comeau, Quebec
 CFTO-DT in Toronto, Ontario
 CHAU-DT-10 in Tracadie, New Brunswick
 CICO-DT-9 in Thunder Bay, Ontario
 CIMT-DT in Rivière-du-Loup, Quebec
 CIVG-DT in Sept-Iles, Quebec
 CKLT-DT in Saint John, New Brunswick
 CKND-DT in Winnipeg, Manitoba
 CKSH-DT in Sherbrooke, Quebec

09 virtual TV stations in Canada